Platon Ioseliani (November 15, 1810 – November 15, 1875) was a Georgian historian and civil servant in the Imperial Russian service.

Educated at St Petersburg Theological Academy, Ioseliani taught physics and philosophy at Tbilisi Theological Seminary and later served for the office of the Viceroy of the Caucasus. His articles were regularly published in the Russian and Georgian press. From 1845 to 1856, he edited the Tbilisi-based periodical Zakavkazsky Vestnik. In 1849, with the support of Viceroy Mikhail Vorontsov, he made a state-sponsored trip to Greece and visited the medieval Georgian Iviron Monastery on Mount Athos. He discovered and studied several old Georgian manuscripts, made substantial research into the history of the Georgian Orthodox Church and published the pieces of medieval and early modern Georgian literature. Beyond that, Iosseliani was the first scholar to have embarked on the study of evolution of the urban settlements in Georgia. One of his last major works, that on the reign of the last king of Georgia, George XII (1798-1800), was published posthumously in the Georgian magazine Iveria in 1880.

Ioseliani was married to Princess Ana Bagration-Mukhraneli (1839–1913).

References 

1810 births
1875 deaths
Burials at Didube Pantheon
19th-century historians from Georgia (country)
Recipients of the Order of St. Anna, 3rd class
Historians from the Russian Empire
Civil servants of the Russian Empire